Charles Lancelot Shadwell (16 December 1840, London – 13 February 1919, Oxford) was Provost of Oriel College, Oxford, from 1905 until 1914.

Shadwell was educated at Westminster School and Christ Church, Oxford, where he matriculated in 1859 and graduated B.A. in 1863. He was subsequently a Fellow of Oriel. He was called to the bar in 1872 and lectured at Oxford on jurisprudence.

References

Provosts of Oriel College, Oxford
1853 births
1936 deaths
Academics from London
People educated at Westminster School, London
Alumni of Christ Church, Oxford
Fellows of Oriel College, Oxford
English barristers
Translators of Dante Alighieri